Hu Richa (呼日查, Pinyin: Hū Rì-chá; born 3 January 1963) is a Chinese wrestler. He competed at the 1984 Summer Olympics and the 1988 Summer Olympics.

References

External links
 

1963 births
Living people
Chinese male sport wrestlers
Olympic wrestlers of China
Wrestlers at the 1984 Summer Olympics
Wrestlers at the 1988 Summer Olympics
Place of birth missing (living people)
Asian Games medalists in wrestling
Wrestlers at the 1986 Asian Games
Wrestlers at the 1990 Asian Games
Asian Games silver medalists for China
Medalists at the 1990 Asian Games
21st-century Chinese people
20th-century Chinese people